Tyler Johnson is an American politician and physician serving as a member of the Indiana Senate from the 14th district. He assumed office on November 22, 2022.

Career 
Johnson earned a bachelor's degree from the University of Saint Francis and a doctorate in osteopathy from Lake Erie College of Osteopathic Medicine. Johnson was an independent physician and a part of the medical group called Professional Emergency Physicians.

Personal life 
Johnson was born in Grabill, Indiana. He and his wife, Alicia, have four children. Johnson is an active member in his church and is an elder.

References 

Indiana politicians
Year of birth missing (living people)
Living people